James F. Kelly is an American actor best known for playing Robert F. Kennedy (whom Kelly closely resembles). Between the years 1981 and 1997 he played RFK in seven different productions.

He also portrayed John F. Kennedy in the 1992 television miniseries Sinatra (TV miniseries).

Appearances as Robert F. Kennedy

Jacqueline Bouvier Kennedy - 1981 film
Prince Jack - 1985 film
J. Edgar Hoover (TV-film) - 1987 made-for-television film
LBJ: The Early Years - 1987 made-for-television film
Onassis: The Richest Man in the World - 1988 made-for-television film
Marilyn & Bobby: Her Final Affair - 1993 made-for-television film
Dark Skies - 1996-97 Science fiction television series

References
James F. Kelly's portrayal as RFK compared with other actors who have played the former Attorney-General and Senator

James F. Kelly's Filmography at Blockbuster
James F. Kelly's performances as RFK referenced in The Biography Book: A Reader's Guide to Non fiction, Fictional, and Film Biographies of More Than 500 of the Most Fascinating Individuals of All Time by Daniel S. Burt, (Greenwood Publishing Group)p. 294 & p. 325
New York Times review of LBJ: The Early Years refers to Kelly's performance as RFK
Kelly's performances as both Kennedy brothers listed

American male television actors
20th-century American male actors
Living people
Year of birth missing (living people)
Place of birth missing (living people)